Thyrocopa neckerensis is a moth of the family Xyloryctidae. It was first described by Matthew J. Medeiros in 2009. It is endemic to Necker Island in the Northwestern Hawaiian Islands.

The length of the forewings is 7–8 mm. Adults are on wing at least in September. The ground color of the forewings is mottled very light whitish brown, brown, and dark brown, or brown and dark brown. The discal area is clouded with poorly defined blackish spots in the cell. There is a curving poorly defined whitish band through terminal area and evenly spaced spots on the distal half of the costa and along the termen at the vein endings, though these are sometimes quite faint.

Etymology
The name neckerensis refers to Necker Island, the only locality where this moth occurs.

External links

Thyrocopa
Endemic moths of Hawaii
Moths described in 2009